Live in New York City is a DVD by British pop singer Natasha Bedingfield, released on 21 November 2006. The DVD features her concert at the Nokia Theatre Times Square in New York City on 8 June 2006.

Track listing
"If You're Gonna..."
"Frogs and Princes"
"These Words"
"We're all Mad"
"I Bruise Easily"
"Drop Me in the Middle" / "I'm a Bomb"
"Peace of Me"
"The Scientist"
"Size Matters"
"Silent Movie"
"Single"
"Wild Horses"
"Unwritten"

References

Natasha Bedingfield video albums
2006 video albums
Sony BMG live albums
Sony BMG video albums